Dyke Branch is a  long 2nd order tributary to the Leipsic River in Kent County, Delaware.

Course
Dyke Branch rises on the Fork Branch divide about 0.25 miles southeast of Cheswold, Delaware.  Dyke Branch then flows northeast to meet the Leipsic River at Leipsic.

Watershed
Dyke Branch drains  of area, receives about 45.1 in/year of precipitation, has a topographic wetness index of 670.15 and is about 5% forested.

References

Rivers of Delaware
Rivers of Kent County, Delaware
Tributaries of the Leipsic River